The Garden Open (formerly known as Roma Open and Rai Open) is a professional tennis tournament played on outdoor red clay courts. It is currently part of the ATP Challenger Tour. It is held annually at the Tennis Club Garden in Rome, Italy, since 1996 (as a Satellite from 1996 to 1999, and in 2001, as a Futures in 2000, as a Challenger since 2002).

Past finals

Singles

Doubles

External links
Official website

 
ATP Challenger Tour
Tennis tournaments in Italy
Clay court tennis tournaments
Recurring sporting events established in 1996